Rockport Colony is a small unincorporated community and census-designated place (CDP) in Hanson County, South Dakota, United States.  It is located on the James River, southwest of Alexandria and southeast of  Mitchell, and is part of the Mitchell Micropolitan Statistical Area. The population was 77 at the 2020 census. The elevation is 1,224 feet.

The Rockport Colony Elementary School, which had 24 students in 2008, is not located in Rockport Colony, but is physically in the town of Alexandria.

Demographics

Notes

External links
 "Rockport Colony, South Dakota SD Community Profile / Hanson County"

Unincorporated communities in South Dakota
Unincorporated communities in Hanson County, South Dakota
Mitchell, South Dakota micropolitan area